Rise or Fall may refer to:

 "Rise or Fall", 1986 song by Quiet Riot, in album QR III
 "Rise or Fall", 2003 song by Black Rebel Motorcycle Club, in album Take Them On, On Your Own
 Rise or Fall (album), 2004 album by Defiance

See also
Rise and Fall (disambiguation)